The 26th Assembly District of Wisconsin is one of 99 districts in the Wisconsin State Assembly. Located in eastern Wisconsin, the district comprises southeast Sheboygan County, including most of the city of Sheboygan, as well as all of the city of Sheboygan Falls, and the villages of Adell, Cedar Grove, Oostburg, and Random Lake.  It also encompasses the Kohler-Andrae State Park on the shore of Lake Michigan, south of Sheboygan.  The district is represented by Republican Terry Katsma, since January 2015.

The 26th Assembly district is located within Wisconsin's 9th Senate district, along with the 25th and 27th Assembly districts.

History
The district was created in the 1972 redistricting act (1971 Wisc. Act 304) which first established the numbered district system, replacing the previous system which allocated districts to specific counties.  The 26th district was drawn roughly in line with the boundaries of the previous Milwaukee County 4th district (downtown Milwaukee).

Following the 1982 court-ordered redistricting, which scrambled all State Assembly districts, the 1983 redistricting moved the 26th district to Sheboygan County, based in the city of Sheboygan.  The boundaries remained mostly consistent since 1984.  The controversial 2011 redistricting plan (2011 Wisc. Act 43) added a number of rural towns to the 26th district and split the city of Sheboygan between the 26th and 27th districts, in order to create two safe Republican districts from what had previously been the competitive 26th and safe Republican 27th.

List of past representatives

References 

Wisconsin State Assembly districts
Sheboygan County, Wisconsin